Y Rhiw is a small village on the south west tip of the Llŷn Peninsula in Gwynedd in Wales.

From the village there are fine views towards Snowdonia and nearby is the National Trust owned Plas yn Rhiw, above which, on the slopes of Mynydd Rhiw is a late Stone Age burial chamber, and neolithic quarries.  Nearby on Mynydd y Graig are three hillforts, several hut circles and terraced fields that are thought to date from the late Iron Age; a Bronze Age cinerary urn was uncovered in 1955.  The village forms part of the community of Aberdaron.

Common land at Mynydd Rhiw and Mynydd y Graig was enclosed by Act of Parliament in 1811, and barley and oats were grown. Manganese was discovered in 1827; donkeys carried the ore to Porth Cadlan and Porth Neigwl, and in the late 19th century houses were built for industrial workers. By 1914 an aerial ropeway had been constructed, passing over the growing village to a jetty on the shore at Porth Neigwl. During World War II, coal miners, Cornish tin miners and a contingent of the Royal Canadian Engineers were drafted in to work the mines.

Plas yn Rhiw 

Plas yn Rhiw is a grade II* listed early 17th-century manor house, which contains a stone spiral staircase.  The house is believed to be on or near the site of an earlier defended house, built by Meirion Goch in the 10th century to prevent incursions by Vikings into Porth Neigwl.  It was remodelled in 1820, when a third storey was built; a stair-wing added to the rear; and the front redesigned with a Georgian façade and 16 pane sash windows, above a ground floor verandah.  The house was restored by the Keating sisters in 1939, with advice from Clough Williams-Ellis (who designed and built Portmeiron village), and is now owned by the National Trust.  The garden lies below the house and is terraced into the slope, divided by hedges into several small compartments; there are views over Porth Neigwl and Cardigan Bay, and in spring and summer there are displays of snowdrops and bluebells.  It is the only organic National Trust garden in Wales.

Other features 
St Aelrhiw's Church was built in 1860 on the footings of an earlier church. It consists of a small nave and short chancel, with aisles to the north and south, and has boulder built walls and a slate roof. The churchyard contains the graves of some of the many bodies that were washed up at Porth Neigwl during World War I.

Capel Nebo was built in 1813 by the Congregationalists; the Wesleyan Methodists followed in 1832 at Capel Pisgah; and the Calvinistic Methodists at Capel Tan y Foel.

Hen Felin, an ancient mill, stood close to the shoreline at Porth Neigwl, and was referred to in a Crown survey of 1352.  A second mill stood above Plas yn Rhiw, fed by the holy well at Ffynnon Aelrhiw.

Bwlch y Garreg Wen, built in 1731, is a typical agricultural worker's house of the period.  It has one door, roughly in the centre of one long side, which is flanked by two small windows.  The cottage has two bedrooms, one above the other, and a ladder would have been used to reach the upper room.  This type of dwelling, known as a croglofft cottage, was to be found throughout the Llŷn Peninsula.

Tyn y Graig was built at the beginning of the 18th century, and is constructed of uncoursed boulders.  It was originally thatched, but a slate roof was later substituted.  It has two tall square capped chimneys, and contains a dairy with a loft above.

Meillionydd Fawr dates from 1616, and is to the west of Mynydd Rhiw.  It is a three-storey building with boulder-built walls and a modern slate roof, which was much altered in the 19th century.

Bryn Gwynt and Pen yr Ogof are examples of "Moonlight Cottages".  In the 17th and 18th centuries it was common for young couples to squat on land; if they were able to build a cottage over night and have smoke coming from the chimney by dawn, they could keep both the house and surrounding land.

Birdlife is abundant around the village, with common blackbirds, European robins, dunnocks, Eurasian wrens and both the song and mistle thrush. Eurasian curlews nest in boggy patches and northern lapwings can be seen in the fields.  European greenfinches, linnets, common whitethroats, common chaffinches and willow warblers all nest in the gorse bushes that flank the sheep pastures, along with European stonechat and the whinchat. Barn swallows, house martins and common swifts nest in the farm buildings, alongside house sparrows and white wagtails, while the woodlands are the haunt of the Eurasian nuthatch, common treecreeper, great spotted woodpecker and European green woodpecker.  common wood pigeons, stock doves and Eurasian collared doves also breed in the woods, along with the Eurasian woodcock. The long-tailed tit nests in dense thickets of blackthorn and gorse, while the reed bunting, common moorhen and common snipe raise their young in the marshes.  Three species of owl nest around the village, and the Eurasian sparrowhawk, common kestrel, merlin and common buzzard can all be seen hunting.  On the coastal cliffs, peregrine falcons and red-billed chough are found, with rock pipits inhabiting the rocks above the tide line.  Great cormorants and European shags, common guillemots, razorbills and European herring gulls all nest on these cliffs, as does the northern fulmar.

References 

Villages in Gwynedd
Aberdaron